The 2020–21 Donar season was the 49th season in the existence of the club. The club will play in the Dutch Basketball League (DBL) and Basketball Cup. It was the first season under head coach Ivan Rudež who was fired in April 2021 after disappointing results. He was replaced by Pete Miller. The season ended in more disappointment for Donar, as the team was eliminated early in the 2021 DBL Cup by Yoast United, and later in the playoffs semifinals by Heroes Den Bosch. This season was the first time since 2013 that Donar did not play in the DBL Finals.

Summary
The 2019–20 season was abandoned early in March because of the COVID-19 pandemic. Donar had qualified for the Cup Final and was second in the DBL standings at the time. The DBL announced that the final against Aris Leeuwarden will be played later in the year 2020.

On 14 April 2020, Donar announced head coach Erik Braal's contract would not be extended in mutual consent. Braal won the most trophies in club history, with seven in total. On 17 April 2020, Ivan Rudež signed a three-year contract with Donar in the Netherlands.

Players

Squad information

Depth chart

Players with multiple nationalities

Transactions

In 

|}

Out

|}

Preseason

Basketball Champions League

Qualifying round

FIBA Europe Cup
Donar was placed in Group F of the regular season of the 2021–22 FIBA Europe Cup. The tournament was played in a bubble and was co-hosted by Donar and Heroes Den Bosch in the Maaspoort in Den Bosch.

Dutch Basketball League

Standings

Regular season

Statistics

Source:

Dutch Basketball League

Awards and honors

References

External links
 Donar website

Donar
Donar
Donar (basketball club)